The Derwent Valley Railway may refer to:

The Derwent Valley Light Railway, a preserved railway in North Yorkshire, England.
The Derwent Valley Railway (Tasmania), a heritage railway in Tasmania, Australia.
The Derwent Valley Line, part of the British national rail network in Derbyshire.
The Derwent Valley Railway (County Durham), a disused former rail line in North East England, now the Derwent Walk Country Park.